Abílio Manuel Guerra Junqueiro (17 September 1850 – 7 July 1923) was a Portuguese top civil servant, member of the Portuguese House of Representatives, journalist, author, and poet. His work helped inspire the creation of the Portuguese First Republic. Junqueiro wrote highly satiric poems criticizing conservatism, romanticism, and the Church leading up to the Portuguese Revolution of 1910. He was one of Europe's greatest poets. Junqueiro studied law at the University of Coimbra.

Life
Born in Freixo de Espada à Cinta, Trás-os-Montes, Portugal to José António Junqueiro Júnior, a supply trader and farmer, and wife Ana Maria Guerra. His mother died when he was only three years old.

He made secondary studies in Bragança and at sixteen, he enrolled at the University of Coimbra, to study theology. Two years later he left to study law, that he concluded in 1873.
Then he became secretary of the governor of Angra do Heroísmo, Azores, and later of Viana do castelo. In 1878, he was elected to the House of Representatives.

In 1885 he published at Porto A velhice do Padre Eterno, that generated strong criticism from Portuguese Catholic Church. After the British Ultimatum and the political crisis associated, he was involved in the political debate in 1891, writing some best-sellers that had huge impact in public opinion, contributing to the discredit of the Portuguese monarchy and the success of the Portuguese Republican Party in the 1910 Portuguese Revolution. He translated into Portuguese short stories by Hans Christian Andersen.

He married Filomena Augusta da Silva Neves on 10 February 1880, the couple had two children; Maria Isabel Guerra Junqueiro on 11 November 1880, second wife without issue of Luís Augusto de Sales Pinto da Mesquita de Carvalho (1868–1931) and Júlia Guerra Junqueiro in 1881, unmarried and without issue. He died in Lisbon at the age of 72.

In 1940 Junqueiro's daughter donated his estate in Porto that became the Guerra Junqueiro Museum.

Works
Viagem À Roda Da Parvónia
A Morte De D. João (1874)
Contos para a infância (1875)
A Musa Em Férias (1879)
A velhice do Padre Eterno (1885)
Finis Patriae (1890)
Os Simples (1892)
Oração Ao Pão (1903)
Oração À Luz (1904)
Gritos da Alma (1912)
Pátria (1915)
Poesias Dispersas (1920)
Duas páginas dos quatorze anos
O Melro

See also
Guerra Junqueiro's Museum

External links

 
 
 
 Junqueiro (2009) A Velhice do Padre Eterno

Original Books by Guerra Junqueiro at the Portuguese National Library :

 Junqueiro (1885) A velhice do Padre Eterno 
 Junqueiro (1877) Contos para a infância 
 Junqueiro (1892) Os simples 
 Junqueiro (1925) Pátria 

19th-century Portuguese lawyers
Portuguese journalists
Male journalists
20th-century Portuguese poets
Portuguese male poets
Ambassadors of Portugal to Switzerland
1850 births
1923 deaths
University of Coimbra alumni
Legislators in Portugal
People from Freixo de Espada à Cinta
19th-century Portuguese writers
19th-century male writers
20th-century male writers